EuroCup Basketball, commonly known as the EuroCup and currently called 7DAYS EuroCup for sponsorship reasons, is an annual professional basketball club competition that has been organized by Euroleague Basketball since 2002. Behind the EuroLeague, the league is regarded as Europe's second-tier professional basketball club tournament.

Founded in 2002 under the name ULEB Cup, the competition has been known as the Eurocup since the 2008–09 season, following a change in format. The ULEB Cup and EuroCup Basketball are considered the same competition, with the change of name being simply a re-branding. 

The two EuroCup finalists qualify for next season's EuroLeague. 

The title has been won by 14 clubs, 3 of which have won the title more than once. The most successful club in the competition are Valencia Basket, with four titles. The current champions are Virtus Bologna, winning their first title after defeating Bursaspor Basketbol in the 2022 Finals.

History

The competition was created in 2002, as the ULEB Cup, and has had several names:

 2002–03 to 2007–08 ULEB Cup
 2008–09 to 2015–16 Eurocup Basketball
 2016–17 to present EuroCup Basketball

Sponsorship names
On 7 July 2016, Chipita and Euroleague Basketball announced a strategic agreement to sponsor the European competition across the globe. According to the agreement, starting with the 2016–17 season, the competition would be named 7DAYS EuroCup. This title partnership was set to run for three seasons.

Logos

Qualification 
Clubs qualify for the competition based on their performance in their domestic leagues competitions. For this purpose, the clubs from countries participating in the ABA League qualify for the competition based on their performance in the ABA League, and not their domestic leagues.

Format
Starting with the 2016–17 season, the EuroCup's first phase is the Regular Season, in which 20 teams participate. The participants include 20 clubs automatically entered into the Regular Season. Each team plays two games (home-and-away) against every other team in its group. At the end of the Regular Season, the field is cut from 20 to 16. The next phase, known as the Top 16, then begins, featuring the 16 survivors of the Regular Season in four-team groups. As in the Regular Season, each Top 16 group is contest in a double round-robin format. The group winners and runners-up advance to the third phase, the Playoffs. Each playoff series is best-of-three, and the winners of each series advance to the next round persistently until the Finals. Home advantage in the series goes to the best placed team in the Top 16. The Finals features the two remaining series winners in a best-of-three series with home advantage in the series to the best placed team in the Top 16.

Previous EuroCup formats
Historically, the competition began with a group phase in which the starting field was reduced to 16 teams. The survivors then advanced to a knockout phase. In the inaugural 2002–03 season, the knockout phase consisted entirely of two-legged ties. In the following 2003–04 season, the final became a one-off game, but all other knockout ties remained two-legged.

In the 2007–08 season, the initial phase, now called the Regular Season, was only used to reduce the field to 32 teams. The survivors were paired into two-legged knockout ties, with the winners advancing to another set of two-legged ties. The survivors then entered the first-ever Final Eight phase in the competition's history, consisting of one-off knockout games.

The following 2008–09 season, was the first in which preliminary rounds were conducted. That year saw two preliminary rounds held, the first involving 16 teams, and the second involving the eight winners, plus eight teams that had received byes into that round. The survivors of the second preliminary round joined 24 direct qualifiers in the Regular Season. This season also saw the introduction of the Last 16 group phase, and proved to be the last for the Final Eight.

The last stage of the EuroCup, the EuroCup Finals, was reduced from eight teams to four, starting with the 2009–10 season. This stage was directly analogous to the EuroLeague Final Four, and like that stage of the EuroLeague, consisted of one-off knockout semifinals, followed by a single-game final. Unlike the EuroLeague Final Four, in which the third-place game and final are held two days after the semifinals, the corresponding games of the EuroCup were held the day after the semifinals.

In the 2012–13 season, the final was decided by a single game format, after double-legged semifinals and quarterfinals. For the 2013–14 season, the competition increased from 32 to 48 teams in the Regular Season phase. Another innovation that started in the 2013–14 season, was that the clubs were divided into two regional conferences, the Eastern Conference and the Western Conference, for the Regular Season phase. The size of the groups grew to six teams, where the first three qualified teams joined the Last 32 stage. In addition, the eight EuroLeague clubs that did not qualify for the EuroLeague Top 16 phase, joined the remaining 24 EuroCup teams and the Finals were decided by a double-legged series.

For the 2014–15 season, the competition contained 36 teams at the group stage. There were 6 groups, each containing 6 teams. The 36 teams consisted of the 7 teams that were eliminated in the 2014–15 Euroleague season qualification rounds, and 29 teams that qualified directly to the 2014–15 EuroCup, either through 2013–14 season results, or through wild cards. The top four teams from each of the Regular Season groups with the eight EuroLeague clubs that did not qualify for the EuroLeague Top 16 phase qualified to join the Last 32 stage. For the 2015–16 season, the competition contained 36 clubs automatically entered into the Regular Season and the eight EuroLeague clubs that did not qualify for the EuroLeague Top 16 phase qualified to join the Last 32 stage.

European professional basketball club rankings

Arena standards
Effective as of the 2012–13 season, all EuroCup clubs must host their home games in arenas that have a regular seating capacity of at least 2,500 (all seated), and an additional minimum capacity of 200 VIP seats available. By comparison, EuroLeague licensed clubs host their home games in arenas that seat at least 10,000 people, while EuroLeague associated clubs must have arenas that seat 5,000.

Results

Awards 

After a given EuroCup season, before the finals, annual EuroCup awards are handed out to players and coaches. These awards include:
Most Valuable Player
Finals MVP
Rising Star
Coach of the Year
All-EuroCup Team

Performance by club

A total number of 176 clubs from 30 countries have participated in the competition.

Performance by country

Statistical leaders and individual high performances

All-time leaders

Highest attendance records
24,232 attendance for Red Star Belgrade in a 79–70 win over Budivelnyk Kyiv, at Kombank Arena, Belgrade, on 26 March 2014. 
22,736 attendance for Red Star Belgrade in a 63–52 win over UNICS Kazan, at Kombank Arena, Belgrade, on 2 April 2014.

Sponsors
Title sponsor
7DAYS
Premium partners
Turkish Airlines
Tempobet (only in Germany)
Fonbet (only in Russia)
Nesine (only in Turkey)
betfair (only in Spain)
sportingbet (only in Greece)
Adidas
Global partners
Spalding
Odeabank (only in Turkey)
Head & Shoulders (only in Turkey)
SEK (only in Turkey)
Oscar Mayer (only in Spain)
Endesa (only in Spain)

Source:

See also 

 Men's competitions
 EuroLeague
 EuroCup Basketball
 Basketball Champions League
 FIBA Europe Cup
 Women's competitions
 EuroLeague Women
 EuroCup Women
 SuperCup Women

References and notes

External links
 EuroCup official website
 All-time statistics with links to all results

 
2

Multi-national professional sports leagues
2002 establishments in Europe